Devault is an unincorporated community in Charlestown Township in Chester County, Pennsylvania, United States. Devault is located at the intersection of Pennsylvania Route 29, Phoenixville Pike, and Charlestown Road.

Climate
The climate in this area is characterized by hot, humid summers and generally mild to cool winters.  According to the Köppen Climate Classification system, Devault has a humid subtropical climate, abbreviated "Cfa" on climate maps.

References

Unincorporated communities in Chester County, Pennsylvania
Unincorporated communities in Pennsylvania